is a Japanese actor and voice actor currently affiliated with the Cube. Inc voice actor agency. Hashimoto is noted for his roles as Terry Bogard and Kim Kaphwan in the Fatal Fury, Capcom vs. SNK and King of Fighters fighting game series (the former role of which he revoiced in The King of Fighters: Another Day anime; in addition to that, he has also had voiceover experience playing Fire Convoy (Optimus Prime) in the original Japanese version of Transformers: Robots in Disguise entitled "Car Robots").

Although not hugely active in the Japanese anime industry, Hashimoto is a prolific actor in various other entertainment fields. He has done many live-action movies, TV dramas and stage plays, and has made appearances in several television commercials.

Filmography

Movies
Kindaichi shōnen no jimembo: Shanghai ningyo densetsu (1997) – Kōda
Whiteout (2000) – Shingo Tozuka
Tokyo Zombie (2005) – Dongaira
Gegege no Kitaro (2007) – Kuko
The Untold Tale of the Three Kingdoms (2020) – Guan Yu
Kamen Rider Saber: Trio of Deep Sin (2022) - Shinjiro Shinozaki/Kamen Rider Falchion (III)
Tokyo MER: Mobile Emergency Room: The Movie (2023) - Suguru Komaba

Television
Furuhata Ninzaburō (1999) – Ishimori
Yūkan Club (2007) – Kongō
The After-Dinner Mysteries (2011) – Kunio Tachibana
Taira no Kiyomori (2012) – Minamoto no Tametomo
Last Cinderella (2013) – Kenichi Endō
Natsuzora: Natsu's Sky (2019) – Kōsuke Arai
Zenkamono (2021)
Tokyo MER: Mobile Emergency Room (2021) – Suguru Komaba
What Will You Do, Ieyasu? (2023) – Yamagata Masakage

Television animation
Transformers: Car Robots (2000) – Fire Convoy
The King of Fighters: Another Day (2006) – Terry Bogard, episode 2 (Accede)

Video games
 Fatal Fury 2 – Terry Bogard, Kim Kaphwan
 Fatal Fury Special – Terry Bogard, Kim Kaphwan
 The King of Fighters '94 – Terry Bogard, Kim Kaphwan
 Fatal Fury 3: Road to the Final Victory – Terry Bogard
 The King of Fighters '95 – Terry Bogard, Kim Kaphwan
 Real Bout Fatal Fury – Terry Bogard, Kim Kaphwan, 
 The King of Fighters '96 – Terry Bogard, Kim Kaphwan
 Real Bout Fatal Fury Special – Terry Bogard, Kim Kaphwan
 The King of Fighters '97 – Terry Bogard, Kim Kaphwan
 Real Bout Fatal Fury 2: The Newcomers – Terry Bogard, Kim Kaphwan
 The King of Fighters '98 – Terry Bogard, Kim Kaphwan
 Fatal Fury: Wild Ambition – Terry Bogard, Kim Kaphwan
 The King of Fighters '99 – Terry Bogard, Kim Kaphwan
 Garou: Mark of the Wolves – Terry Bogard
 The King of Fighters 2000 – Terry Bogard, Kim Kaphwan
 Capcom vs. SNK: Millennium Fight 2000 – Terry Bogard, Kim Kaphwan
 Capcom vs. SNK 2: Millionaire Fighting 2001 – Terry Bogard, Kim Kaphwan
 The King of Fighters 2001 – Terry Bogard, Kim Kaphwan
 The King of Fighters 2002 – Terry Bogard, Kim Kaphwan
 SNK vs. Capcom: SVC Chaos – Terry Bogard, Kim Kaphwan
 The King of Fighters 2003 – Terry Bogard, Kim Kaphwan
 The King of Fighters Neowave – Terry Bogard, Kim Kaphawn
 The King of Fighters: Maximum Impact – Terry Bogard, Kim Kaphwan
 NeoGeo Battle Coliseum – Terry Bogard, Kim Kaphwan
 The King of Fighters XI – Terry Bogard, Kim Kaphwan
 The King of Fighters: Maximum Impact 2 – Terry Bogard, Wild Wolf, Kim Kaphwan
 The King of Fighters XII – Terry Bogard
 KOF Sky Stage – Terry Bogard
 The King of Fighters XIII – Terry Bogard
 Neo Geo Heroes: Ultimate Shooting – Terry Bogard

Stage
 Miss Saigon (2004, 08) – The Engineer
 Les Misérables (2007, 09) – Jean Valjean
 The Addams Family (2014) – Gomez Addams
 Moulin Rouge! (2023) – Harold Zidler

Dubbing

Live-action
Ally McBeal – Victor Morrison (Jon Bon Jovi)

Animation
Coco – Ernesto De La Cruz

CD

Albums 
 Neo Geo Guys Vocal Collection
 SNK Character Sounds Collection Volume 4 ~ Terry Bogard
 Neo Geo DJ Station Live '98
 Neo Geo DJ Station in Neochupi
 Neo Geo DJ Station 2 ~BOF Returns~
 Neo Geo DJ Station Live '99
 Neo Geo DJ Station in Gemodura Night
 King Of Fighters '96 Drama CD
 King Of Fighters '97 Drama CD
 King Of Fighters '97 Drama CD
 King Of Fighters '98 Drama CD
 King Of Fighters '99 Drama CD
 King Of Fighters '00 Drama CD

References 
*Tokyo MER: Mobile Emergency Room: The Movie (2023) - Suguru Komaba<ref>{{cite web |url= https://eiga.com/movie/96378/|title= 劇場版

External links 
 Official agency profile 
 
 
 Satoshi Hashimoto at MobyGames
 Satoshi Hashimoto at Arcade-History

1966 births
Living people
Japanese male film actors
Japanese male musical theatre actors
Japanese male television actors
Japanese male video game actors
Japanese male voice actors
Osaka University of Arts alumni
People from Hirakata
20th-century Japanese male actors
21st-century Japanese male actors